= HNLMS Mok I =

Royal Netherlands Navy Auxiliary

History

Netherlands
- Name: MOK I
- Builder: Rijkswerf Willemsoord, Den Helder
- Laid down: 21 May 1938
- Launched: 11 March 1939
- Commissioned: 1 April 1940
- Decommissioned: 5 March 1973
- Renamed: HNLMS Hendrik Karssen (after World War II)
- Fate: Sold to private buyer as museum ship

General characteristics
- Type: Auxiliary
- Displacement: 186 t (183 long tons) standard
- Length: 37.90 m (124 ft 4 in)
- Beam: 6.6 m (21 ft 8 in)
- Draught: 1.80 m (5 ft 11 in)
- Installed power: 400 hp (300 kW)
- Propulsion: 2 Kromhout Diesel Engines
- Speed: 12 knots (22 km/h; 14 mph)
- Complement: 18
- Armament: 2 × single 20 mm (0.79 in) Oerlikon guns

HNLMS MOK I was a Royal Netherlands Navy communications ship. She had just been commissioned shortly before the outbreak of the Second World War in the Netherlands.

== Service history ==
MOK I was stationed at Royal Netherlands Navy air base De Mok in Texel when war broke out. Being stationed there meant she had the opportunity to escape to the United Kingdom when the fall of the Netherlands became imminent. After its arrival in the United Kingdom, the ship saw its first action with the evacuation of Dunkirk. It was during a patrol on 4 June when the ship was heavily damaged by Luftwaffe air attacks and forced to beach itself. The crew managed to escape on another vessel, but MOK I was not scuttled, leading to it falling into German hands.

Entering service with the Kriegsmarine after being repaired, the ship continued to serve to the end of the Second World War and be reacquired by the Royal Netherlands Navy. MOK I was converted into a training vessel at the Rijkswerf Willemsoord in Den Helder in 1949. The vessel was renamed HNLMS Hendrik Karssen in honour of the sailor Hendrik Karssen. Hendrik Karssen was an Indonesian-born (26 April 1918) sailor in service with the Royal Netherlands Navy in the defence of Java. He was executed as a prisoner of war on 22 April 1942. Hendrik Karssen served as a training ship until 5 March 1973 and was then sold to private buyers in 1976.
